This is a timeline documenting events of Jazz in the year 1962.

Events

May
 29 – The 4th Annual Grammy Awards were held at Beverly Hilton Hotel in Los Angeles.
Best Jazz Performance – Soloist or Small Group (Instrumental)
André Previn for André Previn Plays Harold Arlen
Best Jazz Performance – Large Group (Instrumental)
Stan Kenton for Kenton's West Side Story
Best Original Jazz Composition
Galt MacDermot (composer) for "African Waltz" performed by Cannonball Adderley

July
 6 – The 7th Newport Jazz Festival started in Newport, Rhode Island (July 6 – 8).

Unknown dates
Several recordings are made at the Lighthouse Café in Hermosa Beach, California: Curtis Amy, Tippin' on Through; The Jazz Crusaders, The Jazz Crusaders at the Lighthouse.

Album releases

Art Blakey and The Afro-Drum Ensemble: The African Beat
Bill Evans and Jim Hall: Undercurrent
Dexter Gordon: Go 
Freddie Hubbard: Ready for Freddie
Milt Jackson
"Big Bags
"Bags Meets Wes!" (With Wes Montgomery)
"Invitation"
"Statements"
Stan Kenton
Adventures In Jazz
Adventures in Time
Sophisticated Approach
Jackie McLean
Bluesnik 
A Fickle Sonance 
Hugh Masekela: Trumpet Africaine
Charles Mingus
Epitaph
Tijuana Moods
Modern Jazz QuartetThe Comedy"Lonely Woman"
Wes Montgomery: Full HouseOscar PetersonAffinityBursting Out with the All-Star Big Band! West Side Story 
André Previn and Doris Day: DuetSonny Rollins: The Bridge 
George Russell: The Stratus Seekers 
Cecil Taylor: Nefertiti 
Jimmy Woods: Awakening!!''

Standards

Deaths

 January
 17 – Claude Jones, American trombonist (born 1901).

 February
 5 – Doug Watkins, American upright bassist (born 1934).
 11 – Leo Parker, American baritone saxophonist (born 1925).

 March
 24 – Jean Goldkette, American pianist and bandleader (born 1893).

 April
 13 – John Graas, American French horn player, composer, and arranger (born 1917).
 25 – Eddie South, American jazz violinist (born 1904).

 May
 8 – Donald Lambert, American stride pianist (born 1904).

 July
 12 – Roger Wolfe Kahn, American musician, composer, and bandleader (born 1907).
 28 – Eddie Costa, American pianist (born 1930).

 August
 11 – Israel Crosby, American upright bassist (born 1919).

 December
 13 – Harry Barris, American singer, composer, and pianist (born 1905).

Births

 January
 7 – Tor Haugerud, Norwegian drummer, Transjoik.
 11 – Steve Oliver, American guitarist.
 22 – Jimmy Herring, American guitarist.

 February
 2 – Tapani Rinne, Finnish saxophonist, composer and record producer.
 4 – Jude Abbott, English vocalist and trumpeter.
 25 – Snorre Bjerck, Norwegian percussionist.
 28 – Caroline Henderson, Danish–Swedish singer.

 March
 13 – Terence Blanchard, American trumpeter, bandleader, composer, and arranger.
 24 – Renee Rosnes, American pianist, composer and arranger.

 April
 2 – Thomas Blachman, Danish drummer and composer.
 3 – Dennis Mackrel, American drummer, composer, and arranger.
 9 – Arthur Maia, Brazilian jazz and samba bassist and composer (died 2018).
 27 – Kenn Smith, American guitarist, bassist, composer, educator and journalist

 May
 9 – Jon Klette, Norwegian saxophonist (died 2016).
 11 – Robert Balzar, Czech upright bassist and composer.
 12 – Aydin Esen, Turkish pianist, keyboarder, and electronics player.
 18 – Huw Warren, Welsh pianist and composer.
 20
 Cynthia Sayer, American banjoist and vocalist.
 Ralph Peterson Jr., American drummer and bandleader.
 30 – Darrell Grant, American pianist, vocalist, composer, and educator.

 June
 2 – Ian Shaw, Welsh singer.
 4 – Winard Harper, American drummer.
 16 – Femi Kuti, Nigerian singer, songwriter and saxophonist.
 23 – Andrej Šeban, Slovak guitarist.

 July
 12 – Mike Walker, English guitarist.
 21 – Lee Aaron, Canadian singer.
 24 – Marion Meadows, American soprano saxophonist.
 29 – Lisa Ono, Japanese-Brazilian bossa nova singer and guitarist.

 August
 2 – Billy Kilson, American drummer.
 9 – Edsel Gomez, Puerto Rican pianist.
 10 – Julia Fordham, British singer-songwriter.
 11 – Mike Jones, American pianist.
 19 – Angelo Debarre, French Romani guitarist.
 31 – Joanna Connor, American singer, songwriter and guitarist.

 September
 7
 Paul Tobey, Canadian pianist.
 Rob Bargad, American pianist, organist, songwriter, arranger, educator, and producer.
 8
 Cecilia Coleman, American pianist, composer, and bandleader.
 Glauco Venier, Italian pianist and composer.
 25 – Craig Handy, American tenor saxophonist.

 October
 1 – Fred Lonberg-Holm, American cellist.
 12 – Chris Botti, American trumpeter and composer.
 19 – Bendik Hofseth, Norwegian saxophonist and singer.
 20 – Dado Moroni, Italian pianist and composer.

 November
 11 – James Morrison, Australian trumpeter and multi-instrumentalist.
 12 – Eddie Benitez, Puerto Rican guitarist.
 27 – Euge Groove, American saxophonist.
 28 – Ronny Jordan, American guitarist (died 2014).

 December
 8
 Olaf Kamfjord, Norwegian bassist.
 Tim Armacost, American saxophonist.
 9 – Mia Žnidarič, Slovenian singer.
 15 – Nils Einar Vinjor, Norwegian guitarist and composer.
 28
 Brian Kellock, Scottish pianist
 Michel Petrucciani, French pianist (died 1999).
 Rachel Z, American pianist and keyboardist.

 Unknown date
 Christina von Bülow, Danish saxophonist and flautist.
 Juliet Roberts, British singer songwriter.
 Karoline Höfler, German bandleader and bassist.
 Per-Ola Gadd, Swedish upright bassist.
 Thomas Agergaard, Danish saxophonist, flautist, and composer.
 Tony Buck, Australian drummer and percussionist.

See also

 1960s in jazz
 List of years in jazz
 1962 in music

References

Bibliography

External links 
 History Of Jazz Timeline: 1962 at All About Jazz

Jazz
Jazz by year